Archer Edwin Reilly (August 17, 1891 – November 29, 1963) was a Major League Baseball player. He did not get an at-bat in the game, only playing third base.

Reilly led the Marshall College (now University) football team to an 8–0 season in his only year as Marshall's football coach, in 1919. As the Marshall baseball coach in spring of 1920, his team was 8–8, and was the Herd basketball coach for 1918–19, leading the team to a 2–5 mark.

Reilly had played for Marshall, leading the Herd to the state collegiate championship with a 14–6 mark for head coach Boyd Chambers. He lettered for the Ohio State Buckeyes in basketball in 1911, 1912 and 1913. In those seasons, Ohio State's record was 7–2, 7–5, 13–7.

Reilly was born in Alton, Illinois and died in Columbus, Ohio. He started in the minor leagues in Springfield (Ill.) for the Reapers in 1913 in the Central League, batting .267 with 20 doubles, 10 triples and one home run. In 1914, he played for both Springfield and for the Grand Rapids (Mich.) Champs, batting .271 with 18 doubles, six triples and two homers.

In 1915 and 1916, he joined the Wheeling (W.Va.) Stogies, eventually becoming acting manager midway through the 1915 season. He played and coached the legendary Earle "Greasy" Neale, from West Virginia Wesleyan College, who later played in the World Series with the champion Cincinnati Reds in 1919 (the legendary "Black Sox" series with Chicago taking money to throw games).

Reilly hit .292 for Wheeling in 1916 in the Central League, with 103 hits in 353 at-bats. He then played for both Scranton Miners in the New York State League in 1917, and also played for the Richmond (Va.) Quakers team in the Central League. He hit .250 at Scranton, then .245 at Richmond, and also got the one game call-up to Pittsburgh in 1917.

Head coaching record

Football

References

External links
 
 

1891 births
1963 deaths
Baseball players from Illinois
Basketball coaches from Illinois
Grand Rapids Champs players
Major League Baseball third basemen
Marshall Thundering Herd athletic directors
Marshall Thundering Herd baseball coaches
Marshall Thundering Herd baseball players
Marshall Thundering Herd football coaches
Marshall Thundering Herd men's basketball coaches
Ohio State Buckeyes men's basketball players
People from Alton, Illinois
Pittsburgh Pirates players
Richmond Quakers players
Scranton Miners players
Springfield Reapers players
Sportspeople from Greater St. Louis
Wheeling Stogies players